BBC Scotland's Hogmanay is BBC Scotland's annual live event programme broadcast on Hogmanay, Scotland's New Year's Eve celebration. Regardless of location, the programme rings in the New Year with the firing of Edinburgh Castle's One O'Clock Gun and the subsequent fireworks and celebrations in Edinburgh.

The programme in all its iterations feature a mixture of Scottish contemporary and folk music, with some past programming also featuring live coverage of parts of the Princes Street concert in Edinburgh. Jackie Bird and Phil Cunningham often hosted together each year but from 2008 until 2019 she solely presented the programme. Cunningham does still appear on the programme, though not as a host.

Carol Kirkwood reported on the 2016 edition of the show live from Edinburgh Castle. The show currently is hosted live from The Old Fruitmarket, Glasgow. Until 2013, Bird was live from Edinburgh Castle or Princes Street, but the show's producers decided that it should take place in Glasgow permanently.

In 2019, Hogmanay Live was rebranded to "Hogmanay" and since then, the programme has been pre-recorded. The current presenters are Edith Bowman and Amy Irons.

History

1991–2018: Hogmanay Live 

The programme has its roots in The White Heather Club which preceded it. Whilst Hogmanay Live is vastly different nowadays from the programme that came before it, The White Heather Club brought the Scottish tradition of Hogmanay to television for the first time.

Various incarnations and evolutions of the show have appeared over the years, such as The Hogmanay Show, which blend the old with the new and mark the beginning of a New Year from a distinctly Scottish perspective. Hogmanay Live, briefly renamed New Year Live when it was networked in 1998, has continued this tradition, giving viewers a chance to both reflect on the year gone by and look forward to the year ahead in a uniquely Scottish fashion. Jackie Bird's parts in Glasgow are filmed in advance of Hogmanay and are not live

2019–present: Hogmanay 
In 2019, the format changed and Hogmanay Live was renamed to Hogmanay with the outgoing year added at the end, the first edition was presented by Calman, Clarke and Irons, and was not filmed live.

The 2020 programme was again hosted by Calman and was pre-recorded without a studio audience. It was announced that Stirling Council would team up with BBC Scotland to organise a firework display over the Wallace Monument and Stirling Castle which would be broadcast on the programme from midnight.

The 2021 programme saw Calman axed from the presenting line-up and replaced by Edith Bowman and Amy Irons. Again, the programme was pre-recorded but for the first time, saw the return of a studio audience.

Broadcasts 

The programme is broadcast throughout the United Kingdom on BBC One Scotland. BBC One's London celebration, BBC New Year's Eve specials is also available in Scotland via digital television as well as BBC Two's Jools' Annual Hootenanny with Jools Holland.

Jackie Bird hosted the show every year from 1999 until 2018–19. Before then, it had various hosts.

In popular culture
The show was regularly lampooned in BBC Scotland's 1979–92 Hogmanay comedy sketch show Scotch and Wry (which was screened immediately before in the schedule), which usually involved Rikki Fulton in a post-closing credits skit aimed directly at Hogmanay Live. Since 1993 Only an Excuse? has occupied the same schedule position and continued the parodies.

During Hogmanay Live 2001, one of presenter Jackie Bird's many costume changes included a small gold glittery top. Amid derision from the media, the top became one of the infamous moments of that year's programme and was auctioned off for BBC Children in Need later in the year.

See also
BBC New Year's Eve specials

References

External links

1991 Scottish television series debuts
1990s Scottish television series
2000s Scottish television series
2010s Scottish television series
2020s Scottish television series
Annual television shows
BBC Scotland television shows
British television specials
Hogmanay
New Year's television specials